The camel spin (also called the parallel spin) is one of the three basic figure skating spin positions. British figure skater Cecilia Colledge was the first to perform it. The camel spin, for the first ten years after it was created, was performed mostly by women, although American skater Dick Button performed the first forward camel spin, a variation of the camel spin, and made it a regular part of the repertoire performed by male skaters. The camel spin is executed on one foot, and is an adaptation of the ballet pose the arabesque to the ice. When the camel spin is executed well, the stretch of the skater's body creates a slight arch or straight line. Skaters increase the difficulty of camel spins in a variety of ways.

Description 

The camel spin is one of the three basic figure skating spin positions. British figure skater Cecilia Colledge was the first to perform it, in the mid-1930s. The camel spin, also called the "parallel spin", was borrowed directly from the ballet pose the arabesque, but adapted to the ice. Writer Ellyn Kestnbaum speculates that the camel and layback spins, which "heightened the visual function of the skater creating interesting shapes with her body", were, for the first ten years after their inventions, performed mostly by women because it is easier for women to achieve the interesting shapes they create than it is for men. American skater Dick Button, however, performed the first forward camel spin, a variation of the camel spin, and made it a regular part of the repertoire performed by male skaters.

The most important difference between the sit spin and the camel spin is that the skater enters the sit spin directly instead of first developing a slow part at the beginning of the entry. The camel spin is executed on one foot, with the torso and the free leg stretched in opposite directions, parallel to the ice at hip level in a position similar to the arabesque position. The skater's skating leg is slightly bent or straight, their body is bent forward, and their free leg is bent upward or extended on a horizontal line or higher. When executed well, the stretch of their body should create a slight arch or straight line. Camel spins tend to rotate more slowly than other spins because the circumference of the camel spin's rotation is much greater than in other spin positions, so a prolonged and fast camel spin requires a great deal of technique and skill.

The preparation and entry phases of the camel spin are similar to preparation and entry phases of the upright spin. At the end of the entry, the skater begins to spin by executing small circles on the backward inside edge of the skate while their shoulders and hips rotate at the same angular velocity. Their skating knee extends and their body rises in a locked position. Then the body stretches upward toward the head and neck while the skating leg, which is locked and straight, pushes forward. The International Skating Union (ISU), the governing body that oversees figure skating, states that if the angle between the shin of the skating leg and the skater's thigh is less than approximately 120 degrees, the position is considered a sit spin. If the waist line is not horizontal and/or the core of the skater's body is more than 45 degrees above the horizontal line, the position is considered an upright spin.

Variations
Skaters increase the difficulty of camel spins in the following ways: they turn their upper body (the shoulder and the head) upwards and facing up so that the line of their shoulders is at least 45 degrees past the vertical point of the shape they are attempting to form; turning their bodies either horizontally or sideways, with their head and free foot nearly touching (called a doughnut or ring), with half a blade between their head and blade; turning their body almost horizontally while pulling the heel of their boot with their hand above their head; turning their body forward to their spinning leg and their free leg extended backward and upward up to almost a full split, but with the angle between their thighs at about 180 degrees.

Gallery

References

Works cited 

 Cabell, Lee and Erica Bateman (2018). "Biomechanics in Figure Skating". In Jason D. Vescovi and Jaci L. VanHeest (Eds.) The Science of Figure Skating, pp. 13–34. New York: Routledge Publishing. 
 "Communication No. 2334: Single and Pair Skating". (ISU 2334) Lausanne, Switzerland: International Skating Union. 8 July 2020. Retrieved 29 July 2022.
 Hines, James R. (2006) Figure Skating: A History. Urbana, Illinois: University of Illinois Press. .
 Kestnbaum, Ellyn (2003). Culture on Ice: Figure Skating and Cultural Meaning. Middletown, Connecticut: Wesleyan University Press. .

External links 

 YouTube clip of Yuna Kim performing camel spins. Retrieved 4 August 2022.

Figure skating elements